Iago André Pires de Oliveira (born 28 January 2002), known as Iago André or simply Iago, is a Brazilian footballer who plays as a winger for Botafogo.

Club career
Born in Água Branca, Piauí, Iago André joined Athletico Paranaense at the age of fifteen, having already played for Escolinha do Futuro and Sport Recife. In 2022, he joined Botafogo, and was promoted to the first team ahead of the 2023 season.

International career
Iago André has represented Brazil at under-17 level.

Career statistics

Club

Notes

References

2002 births
Living people
Sportspeople from Piauí
Brazilian footballers
Association football wingers
Sport Club do Recife players
Club Athletico Paranaense players
Botafogo de Futebol e Regatas players